Tyler Mathew Carl Williams (born February 25, 1988), professionally known as T-Minus, is a Canadian record producer. He has produced hit records and worked with many popular artists including Lil Wayne,  Eminem, Drake, Nicki Minaj, The Weeknd, Kendrick Lamar, Camila Cabello, Travis Scott, Justin Bieber, Belly, ASAP Rocky, Big Sean, DJ Khaled, 2 Chainz, Lana Del Rey, Sia, J. Cole, and more. He is one of Drake's longest and most frequent collaborators, contributing to songs such as "HYFR", "The Motto", "Make Me Proud" (featuring Nicki Minaj) and "Blem".

He has garnered over 20 awards and nominations including Grammys, Platinum certifications, and BMI's Producer of the Year (earned on multiple occasions).

Early life
T-Minus first started experimenting with music as a student at Pickering High School. "I’ve always loved music," he says. "I used to play the drums, so I’ve always been interested in music in that way." After sitting at the drum kit for a few years, he decided to try making his own rhythms, so he downloaded a digital audio workstation program called Fruity Loops when he was 15 years old and was soon creating entire songs.

Artistry
On his sound, T-Minus has said: "I'm just taking things to a new place as far as music goes. I don't want to go to the same route that I was going to before so far as how everything sounds, how everything sits in your ears... I'm going back to the roots of R&B, mid-'90s, from hearing a Timbaland record, an Aaliyah, something from Blackground Music, for example. When the music had so much emotion."

Awards and nominations 

He also won Top Producer at the 2012 BMI Urban Awards.

Discography

Singles produced

2007

Drake – Comeback Season
05. "Replacement Girl" (featuring Trey Songz)

2008

Plies – Da REAList
15. "Co-Defendant"

Papa Duck
00. "Look At My Swagg" (featuring Rick Ross & Ace Hood)

Tyra B.
00. "Break You Up"

2009

LeToya Luckett – Lady Love
11. "Drained"

Mýa – Beauty & The Streets Vol.1
15. "Black Out"

Birdman – Priceless
01. "Intro"

Birdman – Family Over Everything
02. "She Knows" (featuring Lil Wayne)

Ace Hood – The Preview
15. "White Leather"

Jazzfeezy – Jazzfeezy Presents: Unveiling the Rapture
03. Unstoppable" (featuring Burna, Bass Line and Dean Gray) 
04. "Words Won't Do" (featuring August) 
14. "Flying High" (featuring Phax and Red Shortz)

Rebstar – Arrival
12. "Without You" (featuring Trey Songz)

The Weeknd
00. "Our Love"

2010

Donnis – Fashionably Late
05. "Tonight"

Ludacris – Battles of the Sexes
02. "How Low"
16.  "How Low (Remix)" (featuring Ciara & Pitbull)

Travis Porter – Proud to Be a Problem
14. "Mighty Mighty" (featuring F.L.Y.)

Travis Porter – I Am Travis Porter
17. "Lay Ya Body Down"

Diggy Simmons – Airborne
02. "Thinkin' 'Bout U" (featuring Bei Maejor)

A-Game – PilotModeMuzik
00. "Go Head Shawty"
00. "Airplanes"
00. "Don't Be Mad"

Lil Scrappy – Prince of the South 2
Leftover
 00. "Get Lost" (featuring Cutty)

P. Reign
 00. "In My Hood"

Lyfe Jennings – I Still Believe
 01. "Statistics"
 02. "Love"
 04. "Spotlight"
 07. "Mama"
 10. "Learn From This"

T.I. – No Mercy
 12. "Poppin Bottles" (featuring Drake)

Ciara – Basic Instinct
 09. "Turn It Up" (featuring Usher)

Nicki Minaj – Pink Friday
 07. "Moment 4 Life" (featuring Drake)

Luu Breeze – HollaLaLuuie
 05. "Makin' A Killin'" (featuring Vado)

2011

DJ Khaled – We the Best Forever
 01. "I'm On One" (featuring Drake, Rick Ross & Lil Wayne)

Lil Wayne – Tha Carter IV
 06. "She Will" (featuring Drake)

Wale – Ambition
 11. "Ambition" (featuring Meek Mill & Rick Ross)

T-Pain – RevolveR
 01. "Bang Bang Pow Pow" (featuring Lil Wayne)

Drake – Take Care
 07. "Under Ground Kings" (Produced with Noah "40" Shebib)
 08. "We'll Be Fine" (featuring Birdman)
 09. "Make Me Proud" (featuring Nicki Minaj)
 14. "HYFR" (featuring Lil Wayne)
 19. Bonus Track: "The Motto" (featuring Lil Wayne)

A-Game – Since 1988
 11. "Cool Boyz" / 00. "Cool Boyz" (Remix) (featuring Red Cafe)

Don Trip & Starlito – Step Brothers
 12. "Pray For Me"

Alley Boy – Definition of Fuck Shit 2
 07. "Word Law" (featuring Veli Sosa)

Birdman & Mack Maine – Billionaire Minds
 04. "Mr. Lottery" (featuring Short Dawg & Jae Millz)

2012

T.I. – Fuck da City Up
 03. "Hot Wheels" (featuring Travis Porter & Young Dro)

Melanie Fiona – The MF Life
 04. "I Been That Girl"

Nicki Minaj – Pink Friday: Roman Reloaded
 07. "Champion" (featuring Nas, Drake and Young Jeezy)

D-WHY – Don't Flatter Yourself
Leftover
 00. "Macchiato Music"

Burd & Keyz – Keyz of Life
 05. "Faithful" (featuring Luu Breeze, A-Game & Jahron B) (produced with Burd & Keyz)

Tank – This Is How I Feel
 05. "Compliments" (featuring Kris Stephens & T.I.)

DJ Drama – Quality Street Music
 03. "My Moment" (featuring 2 Chainz, Meek Mill & Jeremih)

Slaughterhouse – Welcome to: Our House
 04. "Throw That" (featuring Eminem) (co-produced by Eminem)
 12. "Frat House" (co-produced by Eminem and Nikhil S.)

Kendrick Lamar – good kid, m.A.A.d city
 09. "Swimming Pools (Drank)"

Cyhi the Prynce – Ivy League Club
 13. "Tomorrow"

Roscoe Dash – Roscoe 2.0
 17. "Substance Abuse"

T-Pain – Stoic
 03. "Don't You Quit"

Keyshia Cole – Woman to Woman
 02. Zero (featuring Meek Mill) (produced with Vidal)
 11. Forever

T.I. – Trouble Man: Heavy Is the Head
 08. "Go Get It"
 09. "Guns and Roses" (featuring P!nk)
 12. "Addresses"

ASAP Rocky – Long. Live. ASAP
 03. "PMW (All I Need)" (featuring ScHoolboy Q)

2013

Jigg – High Grade 2
 03. "So Hot"

Joe Budden – No Love Lost
 03. "She Don't Put It Down" (featuring Lil Wayne & Tank)
 17. "She Don't Put It Down (Remix)" (featuring Fabolous, Twista & Tank)

Lil Wayne – I Am Not a Human Being II
 09. "Rich as Fuck" (featuring 2 Chainz)

Kelly Rowland – Talk a Good Game
04. "Talk a Good Game" (featuring Kevin Cossom)

Justin Bieber – Journals
01. "Heartbreaker"

2014

Wink Loc
 00. "Want Me Dead (featuring Jeezy and Jigg)"

Bizzle – Well Wishes
 13. "You Know (Remix)" (featuring Lecrae)

Eric Bellinger – The Rebirth
06. "Delorean"

Tinashe
00. "In The Meantime"

2015

Big Sean – "Dark Sky Paradise"
07. "Win Some, Lose Some"

Ludacris – "Ludaversal"
16. "Problems" (featuring Cee-Lo Green)

2016

Travis Scott – Birds in the Trap Sing McKnight
14. "wonderful" (featuring The Weeknd)

2017

Drake – More Life
07. "Blem" 
12. "Sacrifices" (featuring 2 Chainz and Young Thug)

Bryson Tiller – True to Self
18. "Somethin Tells Me"

Lana Del Rey – Lust for Life
06. "Summer Bummer"

Lecrae – All Things Work Together
03. "Broke"

PartyNextDoor – Seven Days
03. "Damage" (with Halsey)

Belly – Mumble Rap
02. "Make a Toast" 
03. "The Come Down Is Real Too"

2018

6LACK – East Atlanta Love Letter
06. "Pretty Little Fears" (featuring J. Cole) 
A Boogie wit da Hoodie – Hoodie SZN
05. "Startender" (featuring Offset & Tyga)

Camila Cabello – Camila
05. "Inside Out"

Rich the Kid – The World Is Yours
10. "Early Morning Trappin" (featuring Trippie Redd)

Tinashe – Joyride
04. "He Don't Want It"

2 Chainz – The Play Don't Care Who Makes It
02. "Proud" (featuring YG & Offset)

J. Cole – KOD 

07. "Kevin's Heart"

Drake – Scorpion 

25. "March 14"

SAFE 

"No Diamonds"

2019

Rich the Kid – The World Is Yours 2 
06. "Two Cups" (featuring Offset & Big Sean)

Dreamville – Revenge of the Dreamers III 

16. "Middle Child"

Young Thug – So Much Fun 
17. "Mannequin Challenge" (featuring. Juice Wrld) 
19. "The London" (featuring J. Cole & Travis Scott)

2020

Aminé – Limbo
05. "Can't Decide"
06. "Compensating" (featuring Young Thug)

J. Cole – The Fall Off
"Lion King on Ice"

2021

J. Cole - The Off-Season
02. "a m a r i"
06. "1 0 0 . m i l'"
07. "p r i d e . i s . t h e . d e v i l"
09. "i n t e r l u d e"
Young Thug - Punk
02. "Stressed" (featuring J. Cole & T-Shyne)
Juice WRLD - Fighting Demons
08. "Rockstar In His Prime"
Bas
"The Jackie" (featuring J. Cole & Lil Tjay)
IDK - USEE4YOURSELF
06. "Shoot My Shot" (featuring Offset)

See also 
:Category:Albums produced by T-Minus (record producer)
:Category:Songs written by T-Minus (record producer)

References

External links
T-Minus on Instagram

1988 births
Living people
Canadian people of Jamaican descent
Black Canadian musicians
Canadian hip hop record producers
Hip hop discographies
Musicians from Toronto
OVO Sound artists
People from Ajax, Ontario
Production discographies